Dekalog: Three is the third part of Dekalog, the drama series of films directed by Polish director Krzysztof Kieślowski for television, possibly connected to the third and sixth imperatives of the Ten Commandments: "Remember the Sabbath day, to keep it holy" and "Thou shalt not commit adultery".

Plot
It is Christmas Eve. Janusz (Daniel Olbrychski), a taxicab driver, plays Święty Mikołaj (roughly equivalent to Santa Claus) for his children and then comes home as himself (crossing paths briefly with Krzysztof from Dekalog: One) to his wife and children, in order to spend the evening with them. They attend mass in the city. There he spots Ewa (Maria Pakulnis), with whom he had an affair three years earlier. Ewa just happened upon the church after visiting her senile aunt in the retirement home (the confused aunt asks Ewa whether she's done her homework, but also enquires after her husband).

Ewa later comes to Janusz's place looking for her ex-lover, asking him to help her find her husband, who she says has disappeared. Janusz leaves his house saying that his taxi has been stolen, although his wife (Joanna Szczepkowska) suspects something and suggests he leave it alone. Janusz answers that the taxi is their sole source of income and leaves. Janusz and Ewa spend the whole night driving around the city, discussing past and present. Janusz is eager to go home and be with his family on Christmas evening, but Ewa is desperate and manages to keep him with her by setting up clues along the way to track her husband down. They inquire in hospitals and at the train station. Eventually Janusz sees through her game but does not say anything.

When the clock strikes seven the next morning, Ewa reveals that she has been lying to Janusz. She is no longer with her husband; they divorced right after her tryst with Janusz, and he has been living with his new family in Kraków for the past three years. She is now forced to face the holidays all alone while watching other families share the love and peace that she does not have. Ewa reveals that she had set up a scheme in her mind - if she succeeded in her "game" keeping Janusz away from his family till 7am, all would be well again. If not, she would commit suicide. They part at dawn, with Janusz returning to his family and Ewa to her loneliness. When Janusz gets home, his suspecting wife asks him whether he has restarted his affair with Ewa. He promises never to see her again.

Theme
The film explores characters facing one or several moral or ethical dilemmas as they live in a large housing project in 1980's Poland. 
The themes can be interpreted in many different ways; however, each film has its own literality:

Cast
 Daniel Olbrychski - Janusz
 Maria Pakulnis - Ewa
 Joanna Szczepkowska - Janusz's wife
 Artur Barciś - tram-driver
 Krystyna Drochocka - aunt
 Krzysztof Kumor - doctor
 Henryk Baranowski - Krzysztof
 Jacek Kalucki - policeman
 In other roles:
Zygmunt Fok, Jacek Kalucki, Barbara Kolodziejska,
Maria Krawczyk, Jerzy Zygmunt Nowak, Piotr Rzymszkiewicz,
Wlodzimierz Rzeczycki, Wlodzimierz Musial

References

1988 films
Films directed by Krzysztof Kieślowski
Films scored by Zbigniew Preisner
1980s Polish-language films
Films with screenplays by Krzysztof Piesiewicz
Films with screenplays by Krzysztof Kieślowski